The 2007 Spanish regional elections were held on Sunday, 27 May 2007, to elect the regional parliaments of thirteen of the seventeen autonomous communities—Aragon, Asturias, the Balearic Islands, the Canary Islands, Cantabria, Castile and León, Castilla–La Mancha, Extremadura, La Rioja, Madrid, Murcia, Navarre and the Valencian Community—, not including Andalusia, the Basque Country, Catalonia and Galicia, which had separate electoral cycles. 812 of 1,206 seats in the regional parliaments were up for election, as well as the 50 seats in the regional assemblies of Ceuta and Melilla. The elections were held simultaneously with local elections all throughout Spain.

The results saw few changes overall, with most incumbent governments remaining in power. The only exception was the People's Party (PP) government in the Balearic Islands, which was replaced by a coalition led by the Spanish Socialist Workers' Party (PSOE).

Election date
Determination of election day varied depending on the autonomous community, with each one having competency to establish its own regulations. Typically, thirteen out of the seventeen autonomous communities—all but Andalusia, the Basque Country, Catalonia and Galicia—had their elections fixed for the fourth Sunday of May every four years, to be held together with nationwide local elections.

In some cases, regional presidents had the prerogative to dissolve the regional parliament and call for extra elections at a different time, but newly elected assemblies were restricted to serving out what remained of their previous four year-terms without altering the period to their next ordinary election. In other cases—namely, Aragon, the Balearic Islands, Castile and León and the Valencian Community—, the law granted presidents the power to call a snap election resulting in a fresh four year-parliamentary term. By the time of the 2007 regional elections, however, this prerogative had not yet been exercised by any of these communities.

Regional governments
The following table lists party control in autonomous communities. Gains for a party are highlighted in that party's colour.

Overall results

Summary by region

Aragon

Asturias

Balearic Islands

Canary Islands

Cantabria

Castile and León

Castilla–La Mancha

Extremadura

La Rioja

Madrid

Murcia

Navarre

Valencian Community

Autonomous cities

Ceuta

Melilla

References

External links
www.juntaelectoralcentral.es (in Spanish). Central Electoral Commission – Regional elections
www.argos.gva.es (in Spanish). Argos Information Portal – Electoral Historical Archive
www.historiaelectoral.com (in Spanish and Catalan). Electoral History – Regional elections since 1980

2007
 
May 2007 events in Europe